McDonald Township is one of the fifteen townships of Hardin County, Ohio, United States. As of the 2010 census the population was 862.

Geography
Located in the southwestern part of the county, it borders the following townships:
Cessna Township - north
Lynn Township - northeast
Taylor Creek Township - southeast
Richland Township, Logan County - south
Roundhead Township - west
Marion Township - northwest

No municipalities are located in McDonald Township.

Name and history
McDonald Township was established in the 1830s. This township was named for William McDonald, an early settler. It is the only McDonald Township statewide.

McDonald Township is the location of the Zimmerman Kame, a burial site used by the ancient Glacial Kame culture of Native Americans.

Government
The township is governed by a three-member board of trustees, who are elected in November of odd-numbered years to a four-year term beginning on the following January 1. Two are elected in the year after the presidential election and one is elected in the year before it. There is also an elected township fiscal officer, who serves a four-year term beginning on April 1 of the year after the election, which is held in November of the year before the presidential election. Vacancies in the fiscal officership or on the board of trustees are filled by the remaining trustees.

References

External links
County website

Townships in Hardin County, Ohio
Townships in Ohio
1830s establishments in Ohio